Everything Is is the debut album by English rock band Nine Black Alps released on 13 June 2005 under Island Records.
The album generally received favourable reviews among critics, and heralded acclaim from portions of the British music press, earning the band a loyal fanbase following in the United Kingdom.

Five singles were released from the album; "Cosmopolitan," "Shot Down," "Not Everyone," "Unsatisfied" and "Just Friends".

Track listing

Popular culture 
 "Unsatisfied" was featured in episode 20 of the third season of the television series One Tree Hill.
 "Shot Down" appeared in the video games Burnout Revenge, Burnout Legends and SSX on Tour in 2005. 
 "Cosmopolitan" is featured on FIFA 06 and Madden NFL 06
 "Not Everyone" appeared on Midnight Club 3: DUB Edition Remix.

Personnel 

Nine Black Alps
 Sam Forrest – vocals, guitar
 David Jones – bass, guitar
 Martin Cohen – bass, guitar
 James Galley – drums, percussion

Additional personnel
 Rob Schnapf – production
 Adam Noble – assistant engineering
 Bill Mims – assistant engineering
 Howie Weinberg – mastering (tracks 6, 10 and 11)
 Ted Jensen – mastering
 Rich Costey – mixing
 Claudius Mittendorger – assistant mixing

Chart positions

References

External links 
 Full Effect: Everything Is Review

2005 debut albums
Nine Black Alps albums
Island Records albums
Albums produced by Rob Schnapf